Uzbekistan and Iran share deep cultural and historical ties.  Both countries are members of the Economic Cooperation Organization (ECO).

Importance 
Iran is an Islamic theocracy, while Uzbekistan is a Secular dictatorship. The two nations have been apprehensive on their difference of politics, but still have been active in improving their relations. They also have ancient cultural ties with each other, with Uzbekistan being a part of Ancient Persia, Sogdiana, and Bactria. It is considered a part of Greater Iran.

Trade

Iran and Uzbekistan have signed bilateral agreements to cooperate in various fields including, agriculture, transport, oil and gas production, construction, pharmaceuticals and banking. The two nations have also worked on overland links and other joint ventures.

Uzbekistan exports many commodities to Iran including cotton, ferrous and non-ferrous metals, fertilizers and chemical fibers. Iran exports construction materials, detergents, foods, tea and fruits to Uzbekistan. The Iranian-Uzbekistan trade turnover exceeded $600 million in 2008.

In 2018, Uzbekistan's ambassador to Iran stated that they intend on increasing their trade volume with Iran, by expanding bilateral ties and enhancing cooperation with Iran, according to Mehr News.

See also
Foreign relations of Iran
Foreign relations of Uzbekistan

References

 
Uzbekistan
Bilateral relations of Uzbekistan